Wayne Wade (born 19 March 1959) is a Jamaican singer, songwriter and musician.

Biography 

Born in Kingston, Jamaica, Wade attended Excelsior High School from 1972 to 1976. His career began in the mid-1970s, working with Yabby You, 1976's "Black Is Our Colour" immediately achieving success in Jamaica. His debut album, Black Is Our Colour was released in 1976, and was followed by further hits with cover versions of The Paragons' "Happy Go Lucky Girl" and "On The Beach". This was followed by further albums Evil Woman (1978), Dancing Time, and Fire Fire (both 1979), before Wade moved on to work with Dillinger, recording "Five Man Army" together with Dillinger, The Tamlins, Al Campbell, and Trinity. He recorded for Joe Gibbs, hitting the UK reggae chart in 1980 with "After You" and "Natty Contractor". In 1981, Wade worked with Linval Thompson, releasing a string of singles including "Round The World", "Tell Me What's Going On", "Poor and Humble", and "Down In Iran". He then emigrated to The Netherlands, and signed a deal with Epic Records. 
He scored a hit in 1992 with "Love You Too Much"

In 2011, Wade performed at the One Love Peace Festival in London with other artists including Sean Paul, Busta Rhymes, Shaggy, Gyptian, Aswad, Third World, Etana, King Sounds and John Holt.

Wade currently resides in Miami, Florida, and continues to perform, record and release records.

Discography 

 Black is Our Colour (1976)
 Evil Woman (1978)
 Dancing Time (1978)
 Fire Fire (1979)
 Poor and Humble (1982)
 Looking for Love (1985)
 Respect Due Always (1986)
 Innocent Man (1993)

References

External links 

 

1959 births
Living people
20th-century Jamaican male singers
21st-century Jamaican male singers
Jamaican reggae musicians
Jamaican male singers
Musicians from Kingston, Jamaica